Dayanand Anglo Vedic Public School, Midnapore (West Bengal) (DAV Midnapore) is a self-funded private school located in Midnapore, West Bengal. The School is affiliated to the Central Board of Secondary Education (CBSE), New Delhi and belongs to the Dayanand Anglo Vedic College Trust & Management Society
, which owns more than 800 educational institutes in India and abroad. The trust was established in 1885 inspired by the ideas of Maharishi Dayanand Saraswati.

History and Infrastructure 

DAV Public School, Midnapore (West Bengal) is a 10 + 2 co- educational private school, affiliated to CBSE. It made a humble beginning in the year 1993. Now It stands grand in an area 5 acres of land having Two big play grounds. The school is managed by DAV College Managing Committee, New Delhi through Regional Directorate, Cuttack, with active co- operation of Local Managing Committee. The school is located in Midnapore at Daak Bungalow Road by Kansabati river side.

References

Schools in Paschim Medinipur district
Schools affiliated with the Arya Samaj
Educational institutions established in 1993
1993 establishments in West Bengal